"Our Own House" is a song performed by American indie pop band MisterWives. It is the opening track on their debut full-length album of the same name and was issued as the album's first single. The song was co-written by lead singer Mandy Lee. It peaked at number 25 on the Billboard rock chart in 2015.

Critical reception
The song has received positive reviews. Alex Bear of idobi Radio described it as "an explosion [of] brilliant colors between chilled-out verses". Garrett Kamps of Billboard and Miles Waymer of Entertainment Weekly both praised the song's disco feel, with the former further complimenting its "Nile Rodgers-style" guitar work; and the latter stating that Lee's vocals result in a "soaring, emotional melody" while positively comparing her sound to Lorde and Gossip.

Music video

The official music video for the song was directed by Andrew Joffe.

Chart positions

References

External links
 

2014 songs
2015 singles
MisterWives songs
Photo Finish Records singles
Song recordings produced by Frequency (record producer)
Songs written by Mandy Lee (singer)
Songs written by Martin Terefe